The Dark Star of Itza: The Story of a Pagan Princess is a children's historical novel by Alida Malkus. It portrays the way of life of a princess in the Mayan cities of ancient Yucatán.  The novel, illustrated by Lowell Houser, was first published in 1930 and was a Newbery Honor recipient in 1931.

References

1930 American novels
1930 children's books
American children's novels
Books about paganism
Books about women
Children's historical novels
Mesoamerica in fiction
Newbery Honor-winning works
Novels about royalty
Novels set in Mexico
Novels set in pre-Columbian America
Books about princesses